The Mafia Only Kills in Summer is an Italian 2016 television series written by Pif, directed by Luca Ribuoli, produced and broadcast by RAI. Based on the homonym 2013 film, also directed by Pif, it was first aired on Rai 1 from 21 November to 20 December 2016. In the United Kingdom the series was broadcast by Channel 4.

Plot
The voice-over narrator of the whole series is an adult Salvatore Giammarresi (Pif), a 10-year-old boy (Edoardo Buscetta) that tells the story of an ordinary family of Palermo, his one, in the late 1970s.

The ordinary events, viewed from the kid's point of view, are mixed with the historical facts, regarding the Sicilian Mafia (Cosa Nostra), which characterized the city in that period. Alternating reality and TV fiction, there are various storylines related to the Sack of Palermo, to the personal friendship of Salvatore with Boris Giuliano or Mario Francese (both killed by the Mafia in 1979), etc.

Despite being set during 1979 and 1980, within the fiction there are some flashbacks in which the narration develops in different periods.

Cast

Claudio Gioè as Lorenzo Giammarresi
Anna Foglietta as Pia Melfi Giammarresi
Nino Frassica as Father Giacinto
Francesco Scianna as Massimo Melfi
Angela Curri as Angela Giammarresi
Edoardo Buscetta as Salvatore Giammarresi
Pif as Salvatore Giammarresi (adult, voice-over narrator)
Maurizio Bologna as Vito Ciancimino
Valentina D'Agostino as Patrizia
Nicola Rignanese as Boris Giuliano
 as Antonio Ayala
Carmelo Galati as Cusumano
Dario Aita as Rosario
Andrea Castellana as Alice Guarneri
Domenico Centamore as Salvatore Riina
Sergio Vespertino as Tommaso Buscetta
Claudia Gusmano as Marina Micciché
Natale Russo as Gaetano Badalamenti
Roberto Burgio as Mario Francese
Claudio Collovà as Filadelfio Aparo
Ottavio Amato as  Salvo Lima
Enrico Gippetto as Fofò
Alessandro Piavani as Marco
Pierangelo Gullo as Sebastiano
Francesca Giordano as Santina
Aurora Quattrocchi as grandma Ninetta Melfi
Adriano Chiaramida as grandad Salvatore Melfi
Mimmo Mignemi as Musumeci
Ilenia D'Avenia as a teacher
Maurizio Marchetti as Nino Salvo
Orio Scaduto as Ignazio Salvo
Dajana Roncione as Jolanda Rubino
Mario Patanè as Pellerito
Pierluigi Misasi as Gaetano Costa
Antonio Puccia as Piersanti Mattarella
Antonio Alveario as Rocco Chinnici
Vincent Riotta as Michele Greco
Claudio Castrogiovanni as Stefano Bontate
Rosario Lisma as Carmelo Iannì
Simona Malato as the mother of Giuseppe Letizia

Episodes

Season 1 (2016)

Season 2 (2018)
Soon after the season 1 finale, Pif declared that he was working to write the second season, and  confirmed that it will be aired in 2018.

Possible future seasons
Interviewed in April 2018, Pif discussed about the possibility of future seasons, because his intent is to narrate the events occurred in Palermo at least until the ones of 1992 (Capaci and Via D'Amelio bombings), as it happened in the 2013 film.

Locations
The series is set mainly in Palermo, in which sometimes are also shown various cultural heritage sites, typical cuisine products or suburban boroughs as Mondello. Part of some episodes is set in various locations of the province as Partinico, Isola delle Femmine, Ficuzza, Corleone, the Garcia Dam and the mount Rocca Busambra.

The fiction was shot between Sicily and Lazio, principally at Civita Castellana, a town of the Province of Viterbo.

See also
The Mafia Kills Only in Summer (2013 film)

References

External links
 Official webpage on raiplay.it

2016 Italian television series debuts
Italian comedy television series
2010s Italian drama television series
Television series set in 1979
Television series set in 1980
RAI original programming
2010s comedy-drama television series